Palazzo Budini Gattai is a palace in Piazza della Santissima Annunziata, Florence, Italy.

External links

Palaces in Florence